The Regina International Film Festival and Awards (RIFFA) is an annual Canadian film festival, staged in Regina, Saskatchewan.

The event founded by John Thimothy was launched in 2015, and concentrated solely on short films in its first year. It was not held in 2016, with its second iteration instead taking place in 2017, but has been staged annually since then and has expanded to include feature films.

The festival also presents an annual program of awards to the films deemed to be the best in that year's festival.

References

External links

Film festivals in Saskatchewan
Festivals in Regina, Saskatchewan
Film festivals established in 2015
2015 establishments in Saskatchewan